Folsom Depot is a former train station in Folsom, California.

History
The station site was established as the eastern terminal of the Sacramento Valley Railroad. The rail yard and initial station layout were engineered by Theodore Judah. Service began on February 22, 1856, as the first passenger railroad in the state.

After a series of acquisitions and mergers, the facility came under the ownership of the Southern Pacific Railroad. The railroad constructed a new station building by 1906. The depot was wired for electricity in 1909 and in 1916 the second story was added. Fire damage in 1924 and 1930 was repaired with minor alterations.

The property, minus the turntable stands, were donated to the City of Folsom in 1970. In 1972, Ashland Station building of the Sacramento, Placer, Nevada Railroad was moved to the site.

The depot and freight yard were listed as a California Historical Landmark under the name Folsom Terminal in 1956. The station building, turntable, and tracks was added to the National Register of Historic Places on February 19, 1982.

When the railway line was rebuilt as light rail in the 2000s, the Folsom terminal was built two blocks to the southwest at Historic Folsom station.

Design

The station building was initially constructed as a single story building, but was eventually finished to a standard design: Two-Story Combination Depot No. 22.

References

External links

Railway stations in Sacramento County, California
Railway stations in the United States opened in 1856
Railway stations in the United States opened in 1906
Former Southern Pacific Railroad stations in California
National Register of Historic Places in Sacramento County, California
Railway stations on the National Register of Historic Places in California
California Historical Landmarks